The men's light-heavyweight event was part of the weightlifting programme at the 1932 Summer Olympics. The weight class was the second-heaviest contested, and allowed weightlifters of up to 82.5 kilograms (181.5 pounds). The competition was held on Saturday, 30 July 1932. Four weightlifters from three nations competed.

Medalists

Records
These were the standing world and Olympic records (in kilograms) prior to the 1932 Summer Olympics.

Louis Hostin and Svend Olsen both improved the standing Olympic record in press with 102.5 kilograms. Louis Hostin also equalized the Olympic record in snatch with 112.5 kilograms and bettered the record in clean and jerk with 150 kilograms and in total with 365 kilograms.

Results

All figures in kilograms.

References

External links
 Olympic Report
 

Light Heavyweight